Huai Khwang is one of the 50 districts (khet) of Bangkok, Thailand. It is east of the city centre. Neighbouring districts are Chatuchak, Wang Thonglang, Bang Kapi, Suan Luang, Watthana, Ratchathewi, and Din Daeng.

History
Huai Khwang district was established in an area formerly part of Phaya Thai in 1973. Adjustments to the district were made in 1978, adjusting boundaries with neighboring districts Phaya Thai and Bang Kapi, and again in 1993, creating the new Din Daeng District.

The name "Huai Khwang" literally meaning 'barricaded creek' (huai means 'creek' and khwang means 'barricaded'). Because the terrain here in the past consisted of wetlands and creeks; waterways were the main means of transport.

Today, the district has attracted a new generation of Chinese, leading it to be called "New Chinatown", as distinct from  Bangkok's traditional Chinatown, Yaowarat, in Samphanthawong district.

Administration
The district is divided into three sub-districts (khwaeng).
Huai Khwang ห้วยขวาง
Bang Kapi บางกะปิ
Sam Sen Nok สามเสนนอก

Places

Thailand Cultural Centre (ศูนย์วัฒนธรรมแห่งประเทศไทย), a venue consisting of two auditoriums and one outdoor stage, used for live performances throughout the year. It was built with a grant from Japan, and opened on 9 October 1987. It can be reached via MRT's Thailand Cultural Centre Station.
Ratchada Grand Theatre, the site of the Siam Niramit show.
Royal City Avenue (RCA), a nightlife area.
CentralPlaza Grand Rama IX
Ganesh Shrine, a shrine of Ganesha at the corner of Huai Khwang near the Huai Khwang MRT Station, where many worship (it is just over the border in Din Daeng District).
Praram 9 Hospital, a leading private hospital

Transportation
The MRT passes along the west side of Huai Khwang, providing six stations: Phetchaburi, Phra Ram 9, Thailand Cultural Centre, Huai Khwang, Sutthisan and Ratchadaphisek.

The Huai Khwang MRT station is at the intersection of Ratchadaphisek Road with Prachasongkroa and Pracharat Bamphen Roads. From this station, several entertainment complexes are within walking distance, including some belonging to the famous Davis Group of massage parlours.

Economy
Nok Mini (formerly SGA Airlines) has its headquarters in the district.

Thai Sky Airlines formerly had its head office in Room 708 of the 7th floor of the Le Concorde Tower in Huai Khwang District.

Education
 KIS International School, Thai-Japanese Association School and Modulo Language School are in Huai Khwang District.
 Triamudomsuksapattanakarn Ratchada School

References

External links

Bangkok Metropolitan Area (BMA) website with Huai Kwang landmarks
Huai Khwang District office (Thai)
Thailand Cultural Centre (Thai)
Huai Khwang Station environs

 
Districts of Bangkok